"Help Me Hold On" is a song by American country music artist Travis Tritt.  It was released in February 1990 as the second single from his debut album Country Club. It reached number 1 in both the United States and Canada, thus becoming Travis Tritt's first number-one hit.  The song was written by Tritt and Pat Terry.

Content
"Help Me Hold On" is a ballad telling of a failing relationship. In it, the male narrator asks his significant other not to abandon him, by confessing his mistakes.

Commercial performance
The song reached number one on the Billboard Hot Country Songs chart.  It has also sold 167,000 digital copies since it became available for download.

Music video
The music video was directed by Greg Crutcher. It begins and ends with an episode of The Dick Van Dyke Show playing on the television set.

Personnel
The following musicians play on this track:
Gregg Brown – acoustic guitar
Larry Byrom – acoustic guitar, electric guitar solo
Mike Brignardello – bass guitar
Paul Franklin – steel guitar
Dana McVicker – background vocals
Mark O'Connor – fiddle
Michael Rojas – piano
Jim "Jimmy Joe" Ruggiere – harmonica
Steve Turner – drums, percussion
Kent Wells – electric guitar
Reggie Young – electric guitar

Chart positions

Year-end charts

References

1990 singles
Travis Tritt songs
Songs written by Travis Tritt
Warner Records Nashville singles
1990 songs